The 2020–21 Liga II (also known as 2020–21 Liga II Casa Pariurilor) was the 81st season of the Liga II, the second tier of the Romanian football league system. A total of 21 teams contested the league, instead of 20, due to the no relegation rule imposed in the previous season by the suspension of the league due to COVID-19 pandemic. It was the fifth Liga II season with a single series. In the regular season each team played every other team once, followed by a promotion play-off and a relegation play-out. The first two teams promoted to Liga I at the end of the season and the third-placed and fourth-placed team played a play-off match against the 13th-placed and 14th-placed team from Liga I. The last six teams relegated to Liga III. The season began on 5 September 2020 and ended on 3 June 2021.

Team changes

To Liga II
Promoted from Liga III
 Aerostar Bacău  (after 1 year of absence)
 FC U Craiova  (after 6 years of absence)
 Unirea Slobozia (after 5 years of absence)
 Slatina (after 7 years of absence)
 Comuna Recea (debut)

Relegated from Liga I
 None

From Liga II
Relegated to Liga III
 Sportul Snagov  (ended 8-year stay)
 Daco-Getica București  (ended 2-year stay)

Promoted to Liga I
 UTA Arad  (ended 5-year stay)
 Argeș Pitești  (ended 3-year stay)

Stadiums by capacity

Locations

Personnel and kits 

Note: Flags indicate national team as has been defined under FIFA eligibility rules. Players and Managers may hold more than one non-FIFA nationality.

Managerial changes

Regular season

League table

Season results

Statistics

Top scorers
Updated to matches played on 28 March 2021.

Promotion play-off
A promotion play-off tournament between the best 6 teams (after 20 rounds) will be played to decide the two teams that will be promoted to Liga I, meanwhile the third-placed and fourth-placed teams would play another play-off match against the 13th-placed and 14th-placed teams from Liga I. The teams will start the promotion play-offs with all the points accumulated in the regular season.

Table

Results

Relegation play-out
A relegation play-out tournament between the last 15 ranked teams at the end of the regular season will be played to decide the five teams that will be relegated to Liga III. Two play-out groups will be made: the first group will consist of teams ranked 7, 10, 11, 14, 15, 18 and 19, and the second group will consist of teams ranked 8, 9, 12, 13, 16, 17 and 20, at the end of the regular season. The teams will start the promotion play-offs with all the points accumulated in the regular season. Two teams from each group will be relegated to Liga III, while the 5th placed teams in both groups will meet in a tie to avoid relegation.

Group A

Table

Results

Group B

Table

Results

Liga I Promotion/relegation play-offs
The 13th and 14th-placed teams of the Liga I faces the 3rd and 4th-placed team of the Liga II.

First leg

Second leg

Liga II play-out
The 5th-placed teams of the Liga II relegation play-out groups face each other in order to determine the last relegated team to Liga III.

First leg

Second leg

Attendances

References

2020-21
Rom
2020–21 in Romanian football